The R6 was a New York City Subway car model built from 1935 to 1936 for the city-operated Independent Subway System by three manufacturers under separate orders, the American Car and Foundry Company, Pullman Standard, and Pressed Steel Car Company. A total of 500 cars were built, numbered 900–1399, and arranged as single units. There were three versions of the R6: R6-1, R6-2, and R6-3. The R6s were a continuation of the R4 fleet and look almost the same, except that the R6 had a two-pane front window compared to the R4's one-pane window.

The R6s were used primarily for increased service in Queens and Brooklyn. They served exclusively on all IND lines for most of their service lives, but were also used on the BMT Division's Eastern Division's  and  lines during their final years of service. The R44s and R46s replaced the R6 cars, and they made their final runs in 1977. After retirement, most of the fleet was scrapped, but several R6-3s and one R6-1 have been preserved.

Description
The R6s were numbered 900–1399. The contract had three separate orders from different manufacturers due to the large order. The R6 separate orders were R6-3 (American Car and Foundry Company, cars 900–1149), R6-2 (Pullman Standard, cars 1150–1299), and R6-1 (Pressed Steel Car Company, cars 1300–1399). Regardless, all three orders were nearly identical to each other.

The R6s were ordered to equip extensions of the IND in Brooklyn and Queens. They were used for service on the IND exclusively until 1976, when a few were displaced from the IND by the new R46 and transferred to the East New York Yard.

Many R6s were replaced by renumbered R1s and R4s beginning in 1973 as the R44s were arriving. These continued to run on the IND until 1976 and on the BMT Eastern Division until 1977.

Preservation
Upon their retirement, most R6 cars were scrapped. However, seven examples have survived into preservation:

 R6-3 cars 923 and 925 were converted to revenue collection cars and formerly renumbered R247 and R248, respectively. Once they were no longer needed as work cars, they were purchased and preserved by Railway Preservation Corp. They remained stored in Coney Island Yard for many years until they were moved again to 207th Street Yard. Restoration will be needed if these cars are to run again.
 R6-3 car 978 was repurposed into a deli (Golden's Deli) at the Staten Island Mall until the Deli was closed in January 2012. The owners of the Deli have placed it in storage, but have ultimately decided to sell the car. The car was successfully sold and is being restored by a private owner in Warwick, NY. This car is trackless with part of the car sliced away.
 R6-3 car 983 was originally on private property in Jacksonville, Florida, where it was used as a tool shed until 2013. It was purchased by the Craggy Mountain Line based in Asheville, North Carolina in early 2013 and has been restored to operating service for their museum. The car uses trucks from scrapped R32s.
 R6-3 car 1000 is preserved by Railway Preservation Corp. and restored.
 R6-3 car 1144 is preserved at the Buckinghamshire Railway Centre in Quainton, England, although it does not have trucks. It was converted into a cafeteria for the museum.
 R6-1 car 1300 is preserved by Railway Preservation Corp. and restored.

R6-2 car 1208 was previously preserved by the New York Transit Museum. However, it was scrapped during the 1980s, along with several other museum cars.

References

Further reading
 Sansone, Gene. Evolution of New York City subways: An illustrated history of New York City's transit cars, 1867-1997. New York Transit Museum Press, New York, 1997 

Train-related introductions in 1935
R006
Independent Subway System
American Car and Foundry Company
Pullman Company
1935 in rail transport